Daegwallyeong (Hangul: 대관령;) is a -high  mountain pass in the Taebaek Mountains of eastern South Korea. It runs between Pyeongchang and Gangneung in Gangwon Province. It is an important historical pass that connects the regions of Yeongseo and Yeongdong. Daegwallyeong-myeon of Pyeongchang County is named after this pass. Daegwallyeong Museum is located in Gangneung.

This mountain pass was used for delivering agricultural and marine products from Gangneung to Yeongseo.

During the Joseon dynasty, Seonbi walked over this way to go to Hanyang to take the Gwageo.

The Old Daegwallyeong way used to be one of the sections of Yeongdong Expressway. The highway has been turned into a local road, which helped reduce the traffic along the way. The Old Daegwallyeong way is 19.1km long. In the middle of the way, there is a divided way into a route that goes down all the way (1hr 50min), and another route that goes up to Daegwallyeong Museum or Gamagol Village (2hrs 20min).

Season 

In spring, as the Siberian air fleet retreats, it is not relatively cold, and only the chilly weather continues. In summer, it is cool and not hot unlike other areas because of the nature of the highlands. In particular, due to the high atmospheric pressure of the North Pacific Ocean, southwest air currents blow in and the characteristics of the windy areas, torrential rains are more frequent.

In autumn, relatively clear and clear weather continues, with temperatures falling below zero. Also, frost or snow is observed earlier than other regions in Korea. In winter, it is considered one of the most snowy places with temperatures of minus 15°C.

References 

Mountain passes of South Korea
Pyeongchang County
Gangneung
Landforms of Gangwon Province, South Korea
Taebaek Mountains

fr:Daegwallyeong